History TV18 (formerly known as The History Channel) is a television channel in India. It broadcasts infotainment and documentary shows. It is owned by a joint venture between A+E Networks, owner of the American History channel, and TV18, an Indian media group owned by Mukesh Ambani. It is available in five languages in full HD across the Indian subcontinent.

History
History was first launched as The History Channel on 30 November 2003. It was launched by a joint venture between AETN International and News Corporation's STAR, through its subsidiary NGC Networks. It had aired series like Boy's Toys, Biography, Conspiracy?, Crusades, Secret Agents and Breaking Vegas and television movies like Marilyn and Me. Following the expiration of the deal between AETN and STAR on 21 November 2008, STAR took over the channel and re-branded it as Fox History & Entertainment. That channel has since been re-branded again as Fox History & Traveller, then Fox Traveller and is currently available in India as Fox Life.

On 9 October 2011, The History Channel was re-launched in India as History TV18, by a joint venture between A+E Networks and TV18.

Programming

Original Programming

 Morden marvels - Treasures of the Indus 
 Vital Stats of India 
 OMG! Yeh Hai Mera India'
 OMG! Chhattisgarh
 Taj Mahal History
 Saving the GangaAnsuni Kahani – Shantanu  (Untold Story of Shantanu and Cricket)
 Saving the Western Ghats
 Republic Day Line Up
 Lost World of Kamasutra
 India's Deadliest Roads 
 India On Four Wheels
 India Showcase 
 India 70 Wonders 
 Independence Day Special 
 History of Sex 
 Genius 
 Air India 182 
 26/11 Mumbai Terror Attack 
 A Brush With Life:Satish Gujral 
 Bollywood@100
 A Passage through India
Source:

Acquired Programming

 Dynamo: Magician Impossible Four Rooms In Search of Aliens Metropolis Serial Killer Earth Tamas: India's partitionFrom History Channel

 American Restoration Ancient Aliens Baggage Battles Barbarians Rising Biker Battleground Phoenix The Bible Bonnie & Clyde Cajun Pawn Stars Counting Cars Food Tech Forged In Fire Houdini Hunting Hitler Leepu & Pitbull Pawn Stars Pawn Stars UK Pawnography Smartest Guy in The Room
 Spartan X
 Stan Lee's Superhumans Storage WarsUpcoming product
 Crassy Wheels''

References

External links
 History Channel official website

Television channels and stations established in 2003
Television channels and stations disestablished in 2008
English-language television stations in India
Television stations in Mumbai
Television channels and stations established in 2011
Network18 Group
A&E Networks
2003 establishments in Maharashtra
2011 establishments in Maharashtra